Tuusjärvi is a medium-sized lake in the Vuoksi main catchment area. It is located in the region Southern Savonia in Finland.

See also
List of lakes in Finland

References

Lakes of Rantasalmi
Lakes of Juva